De Soto Township is one of sixteen townships in Jackson County, Illinois, USA.  As of the 2010 census, its population was 2,388 and it contained 1,060 housing units.

History
De Soto Township is named for Hernando de Soto, the discoverer of the Mississippi River.

Geography

Cities, towns, villages
 De Soto

Unincorporated towns
 Reeds Station at 
 Ward at 
(This list is based on USGS data and may include former settlements.)

Adjacent townships
 Elk Township (north)
 Six Mile Township, Franklin County (northeast)
 Carbondale Township (south)
 Murphysboro Township (southwest)
 Somerset Township (west)
 Vergennes Township (northwest)

Cemeteries
The township contains these five cemeteries: Beasley, Central-Crews, De Soto, Howard and Indian Hill.

Major highways
  U.S. Route 51
  Illinois Route 149

Airports and landing strips
 Southern Illinois Airport

Demographics

School districts
 Elverado Community Unit School District 196
 Herrin Community Unit School District 4

Political districts
 Illinois's 12th congressional district
 State House District 115
 State Senate District 58

References
 
 United States Census Bureau 2007 TIGER/Line Shapefiles
 United States National Atlas

External links
 City-Data.com
 Illinois State Archives

Townships in Jackson County, Illinois
Townships in Illinois